Antaramena is a municipality in Ihorombe Region in central Madagascar.

It is connected with Ihosy in the west, and Farafangana in the east by the largely unpaved Route nationale 27.

Populated places in Ihorombe